The South Africa men's national under-16 basketball team is the national basketball team of South Africa, governed by Basketball South Africa.
It represents the country in international under-16 (under age 16) basketball competitions.

See also
South Africa men's national basketball team
South Africa women's national basketball team
South Africa men's national under-18 basketball team
South Africa women's national under-18 basketball team
South Africa women's national under-16 basketball team

References

External links
Archived records of South Africa team participations

Men's national under-16 basketball teams
basketball